Newton Martin Curtis (May 21, 1835 – January 8, 1910) was a Union officer during the American Civil War and a member of the United States House of Representatives from New York.

Early life
Curtis was born in De Peyster, New York. Upon graduating from the Gouverneur Wesleyan Seminary, Curtis became a teacher, lawyer, and postmaster of De Peyster.  In the year prior to the Civil War, he was working as a farmer.

Curtis stood an impressive 6' 7" tall and weighed 225 pounds.  His enormous size for the time period prompted even Abraham Lincoln to quip, "Mr. Curtis, how do you know when your feet are cold?"  His stature became an issue of concern to his family when the Civil War began as they felt he would surely be an easy target for enemy bullets.

Civil War
On May 15, 1861, Curtis volunteered in the Union Army as a captain in Company G of the 16th New York Infantry. He fought in the Peninsula Campaign and was wounded in a minor engagement at West Point, Virginia. On October 23, 1862, he transferred to the 142nd New York Volunteer Infantry, serving as lieutenant colonel until his promotion to colonel on January 21, 1865. As commander of the 142nd New York Infantry, he fought in the Bermuda Hundred Campaign of May 1864. He took command of the 1st Brigade, 2nd Division, X Corps, during the Siege of Petersburg. Curtis received a brevet promotion to brigadier general on October 28, 1864, for his actions at the Battle of New Market Heights.

His brigade became part of the expedition against Fort Fisher in December 1864. Curtis' brigade was among the few troops to go ashore yet the first attack against Fort Fisher was defeated.  He took part in the second attack in January 1865, in which his brigade played a key role in the Union victory. During the fighting a suggestion of entrenching reached Curtis. He angrily grabbed a handful of shovels and threw them over the traverse shouting "Dig Johnnies! I'm coming for you!" Curtis made good on his promise and continued the attack.  He was wounded at the head of his brigade and received a full promotion to brigadier general of volunteers and was also received the Medal of Honor.  He remained in the army until January 1866, receiving a brevet to major general of volunteers on March 13, 1865.

Political career
After the war, Curtis was a collector of customs in the district of Oswegatchie, New York, in 1866 and then a Special Agent for the United States Treasury Department from 1867 until 1880. He was in the Department of Justice from 1880 until 1882. He was a member of the New York State Assembly (St. Lawrence Co., 1st D.) in 1884, 1885, 1886, 1887, 1888, 1889 and 1890.

Curtis was elected as a Republican to the 52nd Congress to fill the vacancy caused by the resignation of Leslie W. Russell. He was re-elected to the 53rd and 54th Congresses, holding office from November 3, 1891, to March 3, 1897. He was Chairman of the House Committee on the Election of the President, Vice President and Representatives in Congress (54th Congress).

Later life and legacy
He wrote a book titled From Bull Run to Chancellorsville, published in 1906. In 1910, he was the assistant inspector general of the National Home for Disabled Volunteer Soldiers. 

He was a companion of the New York Commandery of the Military Order of the Loyal Legion of the United States.

He died in New York City and is buried at Ogdensburg Cemetery in Ogdensburg, New York, where a statue stands in his honor.

The General Newton Martin Curtis Camp #142 of the Sons of Union Veterans of the Civil War was named for Curtis.

Medal of Honor citation
At the Second Battle of Fort Fisher:  the first man to pass through the stockade, he personally led each assault on the traverses and was 4 times wounded.

See also

List of American Civil War Medal of Honor recipients: A–F
List of American Civil War generals (Union)

References
 Eicher, John H., and Eicher, David J., Civil War High Commands, Stanford University Press, 2001, .
 Fonvielle, Jr., Chris E. Last Rays of Departing Hope:The Wilmington Campaign. Campbell, CA.: Savas Publishing Company, 1997. 
 Retrieved on 2008-02-24

External links

 

1835 births
1910 deaths
Union Army generals
United States Army Medal of Honor recipients
People of New York (state) in the American Civil War
Republican Party members of the New York State Assembly
American Civil War recipients of the Medal of Honor
Republican Party members of the United States House of Representatives from New York (state)
19th-century American politicians
People from St. Lawrence County, New York